Allotinus corbeti is a butterfly in the family Lycaenidae. It was described by John Nevill Eliot in 1956. It is found in Thailand, Laos, Peninsular Malaysia, Singapore and on Borneo, Sumatra and Mindanao.

References

Butterflies described in 1956
Allotinus
Butterflies of Borneo